The Buffalo Bill Center of the West, formerly known as the Buffalo Bill Historical Center, is a complex of five museums and a research library featuring art and artifacts of the American West located in Cody, Wyoming. The five museums include the Buffalo Bill Museum, the Plains Indians Museum, the Whitney Western Art Museum, the Draper Natural History Museum, and the Cody Firearms Museum. Founded in 1917 to preserve the legacy and vision of Col. William F. "Buffalo Bill" Cody, the Buffalo Bill Center of the West is the oldest and most comprehensive museum complex of the West.

Background
The complex can be traced to 1917, when the Buffalo Bill Memorial Association was established after the death of William F. Cody, the original Buffalo Bill. Gradually other elements were added to what started as a historical center. The current seven-acre building has more than 50,000 artifacts and holds five museums.

Since 2008, the center has been part of the Smithsonian Affiliates program, the first museum complex in Wyoming to have this status.  As an Affiliate, the Center of the West has hosted Smithsonian artifacts. It has also recently loaned some of its own vast collections to a Smithsonian exhibition in Washington, D.C.

The museums are connected by a unifying "credo" (adopted 2010 by the Board of Trustees) that begins, "We believe in a spirit, definable and intellectually real, called 'The Spirit of the American West.'" The institution includes the recently reconceived Buffalo Bill Museum, which highlights Western ephemera and historic objects in telling the life story of W. F. "Buffalo Bill" Cody. Edward Rothstein of the New York Times wrote,

The exhibition [on Buffalo Bill] affirms what the center as a whole demonstrates: that behind the mythologizing is something worth cherishing, even if it is flawed, complex and still evolving. The old impulse to demolish the myth has been put aside.

Buffalo Bill Museum 

The inaugural museum opened in 1927 in a log cabin across from the current location. It was moved and reinstalled in 1968, and it is now part of a five-museum complex. The museum offers a wide-ranging view of the life and times of William F. Cody, as well as of the "Buffalo Bill" character he created, which made him the world's most celebrated person of his time.

The museum showcases the fame and success Cody attained through his "Buffalo Bill's Wild West show," and addresses his influence on the economic and cultural development of the American West.

Plains Indians Museum 

The museum features the stories and objects of Plains Indian people, their cultures, traditions, values and histories, as well as the contexts of their lives today. The first curator was George Horse-Capture, an enrolled member of the A'aninin tribe. The majority of the collection is from the early reservation period, ca. 1880-1930. It contains artifacts primarily from Northern Plains tribes, such as the Arapaho, Lakota, Crow, Cheyenne, Blackfeet and Pawnee. The holdings also include important contemporary objects, ranging from abstract art to star quilts.

The museum also sponsors an annual Powwow held on the third weekend in June at the Robbie Powwow Garden at the Center of the West. This event attracts dancers, artisans, and visitors from all over North America.

Whitney Western Art Museum 

The museum features paintings and sculptures of the American West. The gallery first opened in 1959 and was later united with the Buffalo Bill Museum.

In June 2009, it re-opened following a re-installation. Replicas of the studios of both Frederic Remington and Alexander Phimister Proctor help visitors learn about the artists and their techniques. Included are works by other classic Western artists: George Catlin, Edgar Samuel Paxson, Alfred Jacob Miller, Thomas Moran, Albert Bierstadt, Alexander Phimister Proctor, Joseph Henry Sharp and N. C. Wyeth. Contemporary Western artists include Harry Jackson, James Bama, Deborah Butterfield, Fritz Scholder, and the sculptor Grant Speed. Interactive stations allow visitors to create their own works of art.

Draper Natural History Museum 

Videos, natural history dioramas, and photography replicate the sights, sounds, and smells of the area. Specimens of grizzlies, wolves, bighorn sheep, moose, elk and other wildlife are on display.

Cody Firearms Museum 

The museum houses a large collection of American firearms.  The collection includes firearms ranging from 16th-century hand cannons to guns of modern manufacture. It explores firearms as "tools of human endeavors" and boasts a collection of 7,000 individual firearms with ~20,000 additional related artifacts. The core of the museum is the Winchester Repeating Arms Company factory collection, which was transported from New Haven, Connecticut to Cody in 1976. The museum was dedicated in 1991 and also includes a large collection DuBiel Arms Company rifles.

Programming and Activities 
The Center of the West offers a variety of programs for visitors, including lectures, family activities, chuckwagon dinners, based on availability.

Harold McCracken Research Library 
The library houses a collection of 30,000 books, over 400 manuscript collections, and more than half-million photographs. Named in honor of Harold McCracken, writer, artist, and developer of the Buffalo Bill Center of the West, the library supports "inquiry across many disciplines related to the American West." The library has strong collections relating to Buffalo Bill, the Wild West show, Plains Indians, cattle and "dude" ranching, the fishing and hunting industries, the oil industry, Yellowstone National Park, and the Winchester Repeating Arms Company.

References

External links

Buffalo Bill Center of the West
Video presentation of the Buffalo Bill Historical Center

American West museums in Wyoming
Museums in Park County, Wyoming
Biographical museums in Wyoming
Center of the West
Smithsonian Institution affiliates
Institutions accredited by the American Alliance of Museums
Cody, Wyoming